Stadionul Trust is a multi-purpose stadium in Cernavodă, Romania. It is currently used mostly for football matches, is the home ground of Axiopolis Cernavodă and has a capacity of 5,000 people with 100 seats. The first football match played here was in 1930, a match between local team, Mercur Cernavodă, and a team from Medgidia. The match ended with the victory of Mercur, 6–0.

References

External links
Stadionul Trust at soccerway.com
Stadionul Trust at europlan-online.de

Football venues in Romania
Sport in Constanța County
Buildings and structures in Constanța County